The qurchis or qorchis were the royal bodyguard of the Safavid shah. The head of the qurchis was known as the qurchi-bashi.

History 
The qurchis were theoretically enlisted from the Qizilbash tribes and were paid by money taken from the royal treasury. The qurchis lived off the land handouts and fees that were given to them by the shah. During the early Safavid period, the qurchis were all from the same tribe, but that later changed. They numbered 3,000 under the Ismail I at the Battle of Chaldiran, but were reduced to 1,700 after the battle, and then later to 1,000, after Ismail had "done away with 700 of them." They numbered 5,000 under Tahmasp I (r. 1524–1576).

Under Abbas I, the qurchis had become much more important and numbered 10,000-15,000. Abbas I gave several of qurchis governorship of large provinces, which decreased the power of the Qizilbash commanders, who were used to govern large provinces. During the late reign of Abbas' reign, the qurchi-bashi was the most powerful office of the empire.

There were also qurchis who were assigned to some of the provinces and cities, headed by officers who were also referred to as qurchi-bashi, but who were subordinate to the supreme qurchi-bashi. These qurchis were identified by the city or province they served in; for example, a qurchi stationed in Derbent, was referred to as a Qurchi-e Darband.

Local rulers also had qurchis at their disposal, though they were limited in number. The vali (governor, viceroy) of Georgia had a qurchi corps to serve him, including a qurchi-bashi, and a legion of specialized qurchis for his "accoutrements" (i.e. qurchi-e zereh, qurchi-e kafsh, qurchi-e tarkesh, etc.).

Notes

References

Sources 
 
 
 
 
 
 
 
 
 

Medieval bodyguards
Military units and formations of the Early Modern period
Military history of Safavid Iran
Military units and formations of the Persian Empire